The 2011 Sacrifice was a professional wrestling pay-per-view (PPV) event produced by Total Nonstop Action Wrestling (TNA) promotion, which took place on May 15, 2011 at the Impact Zone in Orlando, Florida. It was the seventh Sacrifice event.

The event featured the return of Chyna to in-ring competition for the first time since 2002; in what would ultimately be her last match.

In October 2017, with the launch of the Global Wrestling Network, the event became available to stream on demand.

Storylines

Sacrifice featured nine professional wrestling matches that involved different wrestlers from pre-existing scripted feuds and storylines. Wrestlers portrayed villains, heroes, or less distinguishable characters in the scripted events that built tension and culminated in a wrestling match or series of matches.

The primary storyline which was featured at Sacrifice was between defending champion Sting and Rob Van Dam for the TNA World Heavyweight Championship. At Lockdown Sting defeated both RVD and Mr. Anderson in a Three Way Steel Cage match to retain his championship after he pinned Anderson, also during the match RVD refused to hit Sting with steel pipe when Hulk Hogan gave it to him. On the following edition of Impact April 21, Sting chose RVD to be his opponent at Sacrifice due to his good actions at Lockdown.

Results

References

External links
Tnasacrifice.com
TNA Wrestling.com

Impact Wrestling Sacrifice
2011 in professional wrestling in Florida
Events in Orlando, Florida
Professional wrestling in Orlando, Florida
May 2011 events in the United States
2011 Total Nonstop Action Wrestling pay-per-view events